The Calumet was the second lake freighter of that name.
The vessel was built in Detroit, Michigan, in 1929, by the Great Lakes Engineering Works.  For her first 71 years she was operated by two subsidiaries of US Steel, the Pittsburgh Steamship Company, and the Bradley Transportation Company.  She was christened the Myron C. Taylor after one of the  directors of US Steel, Myron Charles Taylor.

She was originally powered by a triple expansion steam engine.  
During her eighty years in service she was upgraded with a self-unloading boom and conveyor belts, a bow thruster, and her steam engine was replaced with a more powerful diesel.  According to George wharton, of the boatnerd site, she was the largest vessel in the US Steel's fleets, when built, but by 1981, she had become one of the smallest.

In 1956 US Steel shifted her to the fleet of the Bradley Transportation Company, due to an increased need to transport limestone, one of the materials needed in the manufacture of steel.  
At that time the vessel was retrofitted with a large self-unloading boom and the accompanying change in her holds and the addition of conveyor belts below her holds.

Her original steam engine produced , and over the winter of 1967/1968 her steam engine was replaced with a diesel producing .  
Her bow thruster was retrofitted in 1988.

She experienced a number of groundings, collisions and other incidents, none of which caused loss of life or serious damage.    
When she was damaged in 2007, she was not repaired because she was scheduled to be retired later that year.

She was scrapped in Port Colborne, Ontario in 2008.

References

Great Lakes freighters
1929 ships
Ships built in Detroit